Louis Gabriel Robles (born 11 September 1996) is an English professional footballer who plays as a winger for Newtown.

At the age of nine, Robles began his professional career at Liverpool in 2005 with their academy for the next eight years. He then joined Wigan Athletic aged 16. Loan moves to Macclesfield Town and Gloucester City followed in the 2015–16 season. Robles switched to the USA later in 2016 joining Limestone Saints representing Limestone College. In January 2017, he joined Welsh Premier League side Bangor City.

Robles made the move to Spain in February 2017, joining Segunda Division B side Atlético Baleares, before joining the Tercera División side San Roque de Lepe for the 2017–18 season. In June 2018, Robles moved back to England and joined EFL League Two club Grimsby Town, before moving back to San Roque de Lepe in December 2018.

Club career

Wigan Athletic
Robles was born in Liverpool and attended St Edward's College Catholic school in West Derby, Liverpool. He started his career with Liverpool Academy as an Under-9 player and spent the next eight years there.

Signed as a 16-year-old from Liverpool in 2013, Robles was offered his first professional contract with Wigan Athletic in March 2015. He was first included in a Wigan Athletic matchday squad on 17 February 2015, remaining an unused substitute for their 0–1 Championship win away to Reading at the Madejski Stadium. He was again an unused substitute in two more matches that week. He made his professional Football League debut on 2 May on the final day of the season, with Wigan already relegated to League One, replacing Marc-Antoine Fortuné after 64 minutes of an eventual 0–3 defeat to Brentford at Griffin Park.

On 8 January 2016, Robles and teammate Adam Anson were loaned to National League side Macclesfield Town until the end of the season. He made his only appearance for the Silkmen 15 days later, replacing Danny Rowe for the final ten minutes of a 0–2 loss to Aldershot Town at Moss Rose. Three days later, he and Anson returned to Wigan.

On 24 March, Robles was loaned to Gloucester City of the National League North for the rest of the season. He made seven appearances for the Tigers, four of which were starts, scoring one goal. Robles was released by Wigan Athletic in June 2016.

Later career
After being released by Wigan Athletic, Robles moved to the United States and represented Limestone Saints in college soccer, scoring 14 goals and five assists. He was credited with the Conference Carolinas Second-Team All-Conference Carolinas and Freshman of the Year awards at the end of season.

On 27 January 2017, Robles signed for Welsh Premier League side Bangor City. He made his only appearance for the Citizens the next day in a 4–0 home win over Llandudno in the Welsh Cup fourth round,  scoring two goals.

Robles moved to Spain on 31 January when he signed for Segunda Division B side Atlético Baleares. He made his Spanish third-tier debut as an 80th-minute substitute in a 1–0 defeat at Sabadell on 12 February, and totalled five appearances during his time in Mallorca.

Robles transferred to Tercera División side San Roque de Lepe  for the 2017–18 season where he scored 6 times in 33 appearances.

In June 2018, Robles went back to England and  joined EFL League Two side Grimsby Town on a one-year contract. On 28 December he was released by mutual consent having featured five times during his spell.

The same day, he returned to San Roque de Lepe. On 29 July 2019 he came back to the Cymru Premier to sign for Bala Town.

In 2020 he joined The New Saints, and left the club in June 2022 after he rejected a new contract offer at the end of the 2021–22 season.

Style of play
Robles plays in a centre forward role or an out and out No.9 striker, he can also operate as a winger on both flanks.

Personal life
Robles was born in England and is of Spanish descent.

Career statistics

Honours
Wigan Athletic U18s
Lancashire FA Youth Cup: 2014–15
Football League Youth Alliance League 3 North-West Division champions: 2015–16

Individual
Wigan Athletic Michael Millett Young Player of the Year: 2014–15
Conference Carolinas All-Tournament Team: 2016
Conference Carolinas Freshman of the Year: 2016
Conference Carolinas Second-Team All-Conference Carolinas: 2016
Cymru Premier Player of the Month- November 2019

The New Saints
Cymru Premier: 2021–22
Welsh cup: 2021-22

References

External links

Profile at La Preferente

Living people
1996 births
English people of Spanish descent
English expatriate footballers
English expatriate sportspeople in Spain
English expatriate sportspeople in the United States
Limestone University alumni
Footballers from Liverpool
English footballers
Association football forwards
Tercera División players
Segunda División B players
Cymru Premier players
National League (English football) players
English Football League players
Wigan Athletic F.C. players
Macclesfield Town F.C. players
Gloucester City A.F.C. players
Limestone Saints men's soccer players
Bangor City F.C. players
CD Atlético Baleares footballers
CD San Roque de Lepe footballers
Grimsby Town F.C. players
Bala Town F.C. players
The New Saints F.C. players
Newtown A.F.C. players